This is a list of dales in the Peak District of England, arranged geographically from north to south. Most lie within the Peak District National Park, but others lie outside its borders. Side dales are indented under the dale from which they branch. An alphabetical list follows at the end.

Dales draining to the Irish Sea

Greenfield Valley
Longdendale
Upper Goyt Valley
 Dane Valley

Dales draining to the North Sea

Bradfield Dale
Upper Derwent Valley
 Woodlands Valley
 Vale of Edale
 Hope Valley
Cave Dale
 Intake Dale
 Padley Gorge
 Middleton Dale
 Coombs Dale
 Dam Dale
 Hay Dale
 Peter Dale
 Wye Valley
 Ashwood Dale
 Cunning Dale
 Cow Dale
 Kidtor Dale
 Wye Dale
 Deep Dale
 Horseshoe Dale
 Back Dale
 Brierlow Dale
 Woo Dale
 Great Rocks Dale
 Chee Dale
 Flag Dale
 Blackwell Dale
 Monk's Dale
 Miller's Dale
 Tideswell Dale
 Cressbrook Dale
 Tansley Dale
 Water-cum-Jolly Dale
 Upperdale
 Hay Dale
 Monsal Dale
 Taddington Dale
 High Dale
 Deep Dale (Taddington)
 Kirk Dale
 Dowel Dale
 Glutton Dale
 Lathkill Dale
 Cales Dale
 Long Dale (Hartington)
 Hartington Dale
 Gratton Dale
 Long Dale
Darley Dale
Lumsdale Valley
Ballidon Dale
Via Gellia (Griff Grange Valley)
 Dovedale
 Biggin Dale
 Wolfscote Dale
 Beresford Dale
 Mill Dale
 Hall Dale
 Manifold Valley

Alphabetical list 

 Ashwood Dale
 Back Dale
Ballidon Dale
 Biggin Dale
 Beresford Dale
 Blackwell Dale
Bradfield Dale
 Brierlow Dale
 Cales Dale
Cave Dale
 Chee Dale
 Coombs Dale
 Cow Dale
 Cressbrook Dale
 Cunning Dale
 Dam Dale
Darley Dale
 Deep Dale
 Deep Dale (Taddington Dale)
 Dovedale
 Dowel Dale
 Flag Dale
 Glutton Dale
 Gratton Dale
 Great Rocks Dale
 Hall Dale
 Hartington Dale
 Hay Dale
 Hay Dale (Upperdale)
 High Dale
 Hope Valley
 Horseshoe Dale
 Intake Dale
 Kidtor Dale
 Kirk Dale
 Lathkill Dale
 Long Dale
 Long Dale (Hartington)
Longdendale
Lumsdale Valley
 Manifold Valley
 Middleton Dale
 Mill Dale
 Miller's Dale
 Monk's Dale
 Monsal Dale
 Padley Gorge
 Peter Dale
 Taddington Dale
 Tansley Dale
 Tideswell Dale
 Upperdale
 Upper Derwent Valley
 Vale of Edale
Via Gellia (Griff Grange Valley)
 Water-cum-Jolly Dale
 Wolfscote Dale
 Woo Dale
 Woodlands Valley
 Wye Dale
 Wye Valley

References 

 
Valleys of Derbyshire